Tchoupitoulas Street is a street in New Orleans, Louisiana, United States. Running through uptown, it is the through street closest to the Mississippi River. Formerly, the street was heavily devoted to river shipping commerce, but as shipping concerns gravitated to other locations in the latter part of the 20th century, more of the street has been utilized for residential and other business purposes.

Etymology 

The name of the street comes from the name of a Native American tribe that perhaps means "those who live at the river" in Choctaw. 

Location 
The street starts at the upriver side of Canal Street (the opposite side from the French Quarter) and goes through New Orleans Central Business District (CBD) and uptown, following the curve of the river's crescent bend before coming to its terminus, hitting East Road at Audubon Park. 

The equivalent street on the French Quarter side of Canal Street is  Peters Street, which splits into two streets on the uptown side: one continuing as  Peters, and the other as Tchoupitoulas.

See also

 List of streets of New Orleans
The Wild Tchoupitoulas, which also take their name from the Native American tribe

References

Streets in New Orleans
Uptown New Orleans
Great River Road